RFA Wave Conqueror was a Wave-class fleet support tanker of the Royal Fleet Auxiliary that was built in 1943 as SS Empire Law by the Furness Shipbuilding Company, Haverton Hill, United Kingdom.

She saw service during the Korean War and was scrapped in 1960.

References

1943 ships
Empire ships
Wave-class oilers
Ships built on the River Tees